Boxing is high-capacity 2D barcode. The flexible barcode format is fully customizable in terms of frame geometry, number of symbols per pixel and forward-error-correction (FEC) method. This makes it a suitable choice for storing large amounts of any kind of digital data on storage mediums such paper, photographic film or similar.

Applications

Boxing barcode is used on piqlFilm by Piql AS to store many infos in Arctic World Archive:
the Vatican Library
the photographic collection
GitHub
and other

Format

The Boxing barcode used in the piqlFilm consists 4096 rows and 2160 cols. Each frame has:
 border
 four corner marks 
 external bars (reference, calibration, structural metadata, human-readable)
 data container
 sync points

References

External links
 Archival File Systems (AFS)
 Piql film-reader App

Barcodes